The 1997 Pan American Gymnastics Championships were held in Medellín, Colombia, July 2–7, 1997.

Medalists

Artistic gymnastics

Rhythmic gymnastics

Medal table

References

1997 in gymnastics
Pan American Gymnastics Championships
International gymnastics competitions hosted by Colombia
1997 in Colombian sport
July 1997 sports events in South America